This is a list of the rivers of the Cook Islands, all of which are located on Rarotonga.  They are listed in clockwise order, starting at the north end of the island.

Avatiu Stream
Vaikapuangi Stream
Takuvaine Stream
Pue Stream
Tupapa Stream
Matavera Stream
Turangi Stream
Avana Stream
Paringaru Stream
Akapuao Stream
Turoa Stream
Totokoiru Stream
Taipara Stream
Papua Stream
Ngatoa Stream
Rutaki Stream
Muriavai Stream

References
Land Information New Zealand, Pacific Region Topographic Maps, 1994

Rivers
Cook Islands
 *